Gaudentius may refer to
 Gaudentius (music theorist) (2nd century CE?), Greek musical theorist
 Gaudentius (magister equitum), the father of the Roman magister militum Flavius Aëtius
 Gaudentius (son of Aetius), son of Flavius Aëtius
 St. Gaudentius of Brescia (died 410), bishop of Brescia, defender of John Chrysostom
 St. Gaudentius of Novara (5th century), to whom the Basilica of San Gaudenzio is dedicated.
 St. Gaudentius of Verona (5th century), Bishop of the Roman Catholic Diocese of Verona
 Gaudentius of Celeia, (5th–6th century), Bishop of Celeia (a Roman town at the site of modern Celje, Slovenia)
 Radim Gaudentius (970- 106/1020), a member of Slavnik's dynasty, was the first archbishop of Gniezno from 1000 until 1006/1020
 Gaudentius of Ossero (11th century), bishop of Ossero
 Gaudentius of Rimini (4th century), bishop of Rimini and martyr